Vicente Ferrer Roselló (Valencia, Spain, 9 July 1959) is a Spanish politician who belongs to the People's Party (PP).

Divorced with four children, he practised as a lawyer. He entered politics in 1995 when he was designated by the Valencian Community as senator for Valencia province. He continued in that role until 2003. In 2008 he was elected to the Spanish Congress of Deputies representing Valencia region. He was the eighth placed candidate  on the PP list for that election, in a district where the PP had won eight seats at the election, making his seat vulnerable. However at the 2008 election, the PP won nine seats.

References
Biography at Spanish Congress website

1959 births
Living people
People from Valencia
Politicians from the Valencian Community
People's Party (Spain) politicians
Members of the 9th Congress of Deputies (Spain)
Members of the Senate of Spain